Journeyman is the eleventh solo studio album by Eric Clapton. Heralded as a return to form for Clapton, who had struggled with alcohol addiction and recently found sobriety, the album has a 1980s electronic sound, but it also includes blues songs like "Before You Accuse Me", "Running on Faith", and "Hard Times." "Bad Love" was released as a single, reaching the No. 1 position on the Album Rock Chart in the United States, and being awarded a Grammy Award for Best Male Rock Vocal Performance in 1990. "Pretending" had also reached the No. 1 position on the Album Rock Chart the previous year, remaining at the top for five weeks ("Bad Love" had only stayed for three weeks).

The album reached number 2 on the UK Albums Chart and 16 on the US Billboard 200 chart, and it went on to become double platinum in the US. Clapton has said Journeyman is one of his favourite albums.

Critical reception 
Reviewing in December 1989 for The Village Voice, Robert Christgau gave the album a B-minus and wrote of Clapton, "What did you expect him to call it – Hack? Layla and 461 Ocean Boulevard were clearly flukes: he has no record-making knack. So he farms out the songs, sings them competently enough, and marks them with his guitar. Which sounds kind of like Mark Knopfler's."  In a retrospective review for AllMusic, Stephen Thomas Erlewine praised the album for its "convincing" vocals and "consistently strong" songwriting.

Track listing

Side one
 "Pretending" (Jerry Lynn Williams) – 4:48
 "Anything for Your Love" (Jerry Lynn Williams) – 4:16
 "Bad Love" (Eric Clapton, Mick Jones) – 5:11
 "Running on Faith" (Jerry Lynn Williams) – 5:27
 "Hard Times" (Ray Charles) – 3:00
 "Hound Dog" (Jerry Leiber, Mike Stoller) – 2:26

Side two
 "No Alibis" (Jerry Lynn Williams) – 5:32
 "Run So Far" (George Harrison) – 4:06
 "Old Love" (Eric Clapton, Robert Cray) – 6:25
 "Breaking Point" (Marty Grebb, Jerry Lynn Williams) – 5:37
 "Lead Me On" (Cecil Womack, Linda Womack) – 5:52
 "Before You Accuse Me" (Ellas McDaniel) – 3:55

Outtakes
"Forever" Unissued
"Don't Turn Your Back" Unissued
"Something About You" Unissued

Personnel

Musicians 

Track numbers refer to CD and digital releases of the album.

 Eric Clapton – lead vocals, guitar
 Jeff Bova – synth horns (1), synth organ (1), synthesizer programming (2, 10), drum programming (10), sequenced bass (10), sequenced organ (10)
 Alan Clark – synth horns (1), Hammond organ (1, 4), sequenced bass (1), keyboards (3), synthesizers (8), synth strings (9)
 Greg Phillinganes – acoustic piano (1, 4, 5), keyboards (2, 7, 10), backing vocals (4, 7), synthesizers (8)
 Richard Tee – acoustic piano (2, 6, 7, 9, 12), Fender Rhodes (11)
 Robbie Kondor – keyboards (2), vocoder (2), bass harmonica (2), drum programming (2), synthesizers (6, 12), synthesizer programming (7, 8), synth piano (9)
 Rob Mounsey – synthesizers (8)
 Robbie Kilgore – synthesizers (11)
 Jerry Lynn Williams – guitar (1), backing and harmony vocals (1)
 Robert Cray – guitar (2, 6, 9, 12), guitar solo (9, 12)
 Phil Palmer – guitar (3)
 John Tropea – rhythm guitar (5)
 George Harrison – guitar (8), harmony vocals (8)
 Cecil Womack – acoustic guitar (11), backing vocals (11)
 Nathan East – bass (1, 2, 4-7, 9-12), backing vocals (1, 4, 7)
 Pino Palladino – bass (3)
 Darryl Jones – bass (8)
 Jimmy Bralower – drum programming (1, 7, 8)
 Jim Keltner – drums (2, 6, 8, 9, 10, 12), percussion (6), programming (8, 10) tambourine (9)
 Phil Collins – drums (3), backing and harmony vocals (3)
 Steve Ferrone – drums (4, 5, 11), hi-hat (10)
 Carol Steele – congas (1), tambourine (4), percussion (7, 10, 11)
 Gary Burton – vibraphone (9)
 Hank Crawford – alto saxophone (5)
 David Sanborn – alto saxophone (10)
 Ronnie Cuber – baritone saxophone (5)
 David "Fathead" Newman – tenor saxophone (5)
 Jon Faddis – trumpet (5)
 Lew Soloff – trumpet (5)
 Arif Mardin – horn arrangements (5), string arrangements (11)
 Chaka Khan – backing vocals (1, 7)
 Katie Kissoon – backing vocals (3)
 Tessa Niles – backing vocals (3)
 Lani Groves – backing vocals (4, 7)
 Rev. Timothy Wright Washington Temple Concert Choir – choir (4)
 Roger Forrester and Friends – dog barking (6)
 Daryl Hall – harmony vocals (7)
 Tawatha Agee – backing vocals (10)
 Vaneese Thomas – backing vocals (10)
 Linda Womack – backing vocals (11)

Production 

 Produced by Russ Titelman
 Engineered by Steve "Barney" Chase, Dave O'Donnell, Jack Joseph Puig and Dave Wittman.
 Assistant Engineers – Richard Arnold, Paul Angelli, Mike Knowles and U.E. Natasi.
 Additional engineering by Larry Alexander, Ben Fowler, Michael O'Reilly and Steve Rinkoff.
 Recorded at The Power Station (NYC), Skyline Studios (NYC) and The Town House (London).
 Mixing – Rob Eaton (tracks 1, 2, 4, 8); Gary Wright and Russ Titelman (tracks 3, 6, 7, 9-12); Steve Chase (track 5).
 Recording and Mix Assistant – Ben Fowler
 Mixed at The Power Station and The Town House.
 Mastered by Ted Jensen at Sterling Sound, NYC.
 Production Coordination – Jill Dell'Abate
 Production Assistant – Alexandra Saraspe Conomos
 Design – Bill Smith Studio
 Original Design Concept – Eric Clapton
 Photography – Terry O'Neill
 Management, 'Road' Photography – Roger Forrester

Charts

Weekly charts

Year-end charts

Certifications

References

Eric Clapton albums
1989 albums
Albums produced by Russ Titelman
Reprise Records albums